"Procrustes" is an English-language science fiction short story written in 1993 by Larry Niven. It is the sixth in the series of stories about crashlander Beowulf Shaeffer.  The short story was originally published in Bridging the Galaxies (1993).

The story is retold, from the point of view of Sigmund Ausfaller, in Juggler of Worlds.

Plot summary
Beowulf "Bey" Shaeffer, half-dreaming, fitfully remembers events leading up to the moment he is shot with an ARM punchgun, a weapon best described as a large-caliber handgun. The recent events, and his memories leading up to them, keep replaying in his head, and Shaeffer realizes that he must be inside Carlos Wu's special autodoc, and that he must be terribly damaged.

When he finally awakens, Shaeffer learns he has been in the autodoc for four months and eleven days. He crawls out of the autodoc, feeling unbalanced, and finds himself on the same deserted island on which they had all landed, though he is alone. Moving to the center of the island, which is a shallow cone, he finds the corpse of a tall, headless man in the depression. It is not Carlos, Sharrol Janss, or Feather Filip. Shaeffer takes the boots, pants, and jacket, the latter torn front and back by a large hole. He finds a knife, a ration brick, some sunblock, and tannin pills in the pockets of the jacket. He barely manages to climb out of the cone’s depression then heads back to the autodoc to fix his ruined skin and feet; the yellow sun of Fafnir has ravaged his albino skin and the coral has cut his feet.

After falling asleep, Shaeffer dreams of the events leading up to him reawakening in the autodoc the first time. He and Sharrol had gone to a party held at Carlos’s home in the Great Barrier Reef. There they met Feather Filip. The party was to feature small dinner dishes and recreational sex. Once there, Carlos tells them that Feather is an ARM, part of the United Nations police. After a few hours of eating and sex, Feather activates a shield to keep them from being spied upon and gets to work, knowing that anyone who’d been watching would expect that Feather had something too kinky in mind to share over surveillance tapes. Carlos worries that the ARM will care what they’re saying, but Feather says they will dismiss it as “Feather coming down after a long week.”

Carlos and Feather intend to leave Earth for good. They want to go as a group, four adults and two children, to match the profile of a family on Fafnir that has fallen on hard times. They will provide the family, the Graynors, with transportation to Wunderland and funding once they are there, and under their names Carlos, Feather, Shaeffer, Sharrol and the kids Tanya and Louis will continue on to Home as Shashters (residents of Fafnir's one continent, Shasht).  Sharrol is annoyed as she and Carlos had talked this over extensively, years before. Sharrol has Flatland Phobia, she cannot leave Earth, which Carlos knows. Their plan to work around that is that Sharrol, Tanya and Louis will travel in cold sleep to Fafnir then again to Home. Both Carlos and Feather have their reasons for going; Carlos is tired of the ARM supervising his every move, and Feather is about to retire and knows she will never be let off-planet and the United Nations will never approve a “schiz” (a paranoid schizophrenic) having children. Feather also tells Shaeffer the UN will never let him off Earth again as he knows too much about the Core explosion, the puppeteers and Kdatlyno, and Julian Forward’s work.  Carlos told Feather he wanted to offer them the chance to come along, as they need a pilot, and Shaeffer can fill that need. They talk it over until Shaeffer and Sharrol are convinced.

After landing on Mars in the hyperdrive ship "Boy George", Shaeffer and Feather leave to retrieve the ship they will use to land on Fafnir. It is a stealth lander, used during the Fourth Man-Kzin War, and the ARM thinks it’s going to the Smithsonian Luna to be displayed as the ship that Sinbad Jabar landed on Kzinhome with to invade and destroy the Patriarch’s harem. Shaeffer reads up on life and lifestyles on Fafnir; it has a 22-hour day, and the locals move at their own pace. Shaeffer, Feather, and Carlos move Carlos’ massive autodoc into the lander, put Sharrol into the intensive care cavity to sleep throughout the trip, put Tanya and Louis in the cold sleep box together, then leave in the Boy George for the three-week trip to Fafnir. Shaeffer remembered it was an uncomfortable trip; Feather kept giving him strange looks, so he avoided her until the night before they reached Fafnir, when she turned up between his sleeping plates. They were both aroused, but the next day she was all business as they exited Boy George behind Fafnir’s moon in the lander while the ship traveled on alone, passing too close to an ARM base on an asteroid that Feather was not supposed to know about, but did, then changed course hastily and left in the direction of another ex-Kzinti world, Hrooshpithtcha, to throw off their trail.

In the lander, Shaeffer found a small island with no one around and used the lower jets to burn out the lamplighter nest in it, then sank the lander into the melting center. In the morning, when dawn gave them enough light, they inflated the boat, then Feather and Carlos used the gravity lift to put the freezebox with Tanya and Louis in it into it. Feather brought the lift to the autodoc and they moved it toward the boat as Feather called him. Turning toward her is the last thing Shaeffer remembers.  Now, four months later, Shaeffer realizes that Feather did not just want to leave Earth, she wanted Carlos as well. But Carlos wanted Sharrol and his children, and Sharrol would not leave earth without Shaeffer. After they arrived, Carlos knew he was no longer useful to Feather. She shot Shaeffer to prove that she could and would take life, if necessary. But Shaeffer remembered seeing Carlos leaping into the boat just after he was shot.

Shaeffer hides the autodoc using the gravity lift to move it into the sea at low tide. The only time he would not be able to use it is during high tide. For the next week, Shaeffer lives at sea, scooping up sunbunnies and finding clutches of eggs. Finally, on the eighth night, he sees lights near the horizon. Using mag-specs, Shaeffer sees that it is a boat, but is not moving. Sending up flares, Shaeffer begins swimming toward the boat. He doesn't want anyone to know that's where he and Carlos' autodoc had been hidden.

The owners of the boat are siblings Wilhelmin and Toranaga, their boat is called the Gullfish. They had both been recently separated from their mates. They replaced his torn jacket with a new one from a locker on their boat, after he cleans out his pockets. Shaeffer presented himself as Persial January Herbert, an identity he assumed as part of setting up his accounts on Fafnir and Home using money given to him by his oldest friend on Earth, Elephant. Shaeffer tells Wil and Tor a story of having lost his wife, Milcenta, in a boating accident, then being rescued and trying to find her but ultimately becoming depressed and drinking. When a torpedo ray hits his boat, Persial gives up and starts swimming. He then decides she might still be alive under a different name. Searching the records of Fafnir for either Sharrol or Feather, he finds Sharrol alive and safe under the name Milcenta, but not Feather. The tradition on Fafnir when rescued is to give your rescuers a life gift, a present expressing your value as perceived by yourself.

Twelve days after being picked up, they arrive at Booty Island. At the hotel, Shaeffer uses the styler and his rooms caller to check for Sharrol after establishing his identity as Martin Wallace Graynor. It found that Sharrol had been using autodocs, but had never made her way to Shasht, to find Carlos, Tanya, or Louis. Shaeffer thinks she may be grieving over losing him. Using a transfer booth to travel to Shasht, Shaeffer visits Outbound Enterprises, the iceliner company they were using to travel to Home. He explains that he is four months late because he’d been shipwrecked. His husband, John Graynor (Carlos) and their children Tween and Nathan (Tanya and Louis, respectively) had gone on to Home, but neither Milcenta nor Adelaide (Feather) had shown up either. However, John had left a message for Adelaide. Shaeffer persuades the clerk to read it then show it to him, so that he could know whether Milcenta was dead or not.

Shaeffer alters a transfer booth card to let him go on a random walk, as users flash from booth to booth in a local area every few seconds. There is a chance he’ll come across Feather rather than Sharrol, but he decides to risk it. He believes Sharrol has likely taken a job somewhere in Pacifica, since she has not gone on to Home or Shasht. 

At Solarico Omni, he finds Sharrol. At first she is terrified of him and points Feather’s punchgun at him, which she kept. Keeping himself between her and a Kzin officer, Shaeffer tries to calm her fears. She recounts waking up on Fafnir, with everything feeling wrong, the light, the gravity, and Earth so far away. Then a booming sound and Shaeffer falling to the ground as Feather pointed her weapon at him.  Carlos had jumped into the boat and roared away, while Feather screamed at him, Shaeffer looking dead to her. Sharrol jumped on Feather’s back and cut her throat. Feather was a trained ARM but she never took Sharrol seriously, which proved to be her last mistake. The tall, headless man on the beach was Shaeffer's corpse: He couldn't fit in the autodoc as it was designed for smaller humans.. So Sharrol could only put his head in there and hope for the best.

Shaeffer and Sharrol tape messages for their benefactors, Wil and Tor in Shaeffer’s case, and the crew of Hand of Allah in Sharrol’s. They present them with life gifts: Shaeffer gives Wil and Tor silverware service for a dozen, while Sharrol gives the crew of Hand of Allah red meat and vegetables. Wil and Tor have undoubtedly turned in the torn jacket to Fafnir police but they will never know if he was a murderer, as Shaeffer had presented a plausible reason for the tears in his jacket, and there was just no evidence otherwise.  They then tape a message for Carlos as John Graynor with Ms. Machti, the Outbound Enterprises desk clerk, in mind as well, letting him know that Milcenta was safe and hinting that Adelaide was 'out of the picture'. Sharrol does not want to travel again anytime soon so they plan to stay on Fafnir for a while; being underwater is second nature for Sharrol, and similar to being underground for Shaeffer, if he doesn't look out a window.

See also

"Neutron Star", the first story in the Beowulf Shaeffer series
"At the Core", the second story in the series
"Flatlander", the third story in the series
"Grendel", the fourth story in the series
"The Borderland of Sol", the fifth story in the series
"Ghost", the framing story in the collection Crashlander
"Fly By Night (Niven)", the seventh story in the series, written after Crashlander

External links

1994 short stories
Fiction set around 61 Ursae Majoris
Known Space stories
Short stories set on Mars
Short stories by Larry Niven
Alpha Centauri in fiction